Siberian taimen (Hucho taimen), also known as the common taimen, Siberian giant trout or Siberian salmon, is a species of salmon-like ray-finned fish from the genus Hucho in the family Salmonidae.  These fish are found in rivers in Siberia and adjacent regions, and are harvested throughout the year.

Habits and range
The taimen is distributed from the Volga and Pechora River basins in the west to the Yana and Amur River basins in the east, spanning portions of Russia, Kazakhstan, Mongolia, and China. On a larger scale, this includes parts of the Caspian, Arctic, and Pacific drainages in Eurasia. In Mongolia, the taimen is found in both the Arctic and Pacific drainages, specifically the Yenisei/Selenga, the Lena, and the Amur River Basins. The taimen lives in flowing water and is only occasionally found in lakes, usually near the mouth of a tributary. The taimen is not anadromous, but does show increased movement rates during the spawning season. Some authors consider the taimen to be a subspecies of the huchen, i.e. Hucho hucho taimen.

Description
Coloration varies geographically, but is generally olive green on the head blending to reddish brown in the tail. Adipose, anal, and caudal fins are often dark red. The belly ranges from nearly white to dark gray. The taimen appears to be the largest salmonid in the world, being heavier at average and maximum sizes than the largest North American salmonid, the chinook salmon. It can reach at least 55 years of age.

Diet
Adult taimen are mainly piscivores, though they frequently eat terrestrial prey such as rodents and birds.

Angling and commercial use

The taimen is becoming a more well-known game fish, particularly for fly fishers. Catch-and-release with barbless hooks is practiced in many areas to conserve dwindling populations of this species. Organizations such as the Taimen Conservation Fund are working to conserve the remaining populations. While the taimen is sometimes (often illegally) harvested commercially, its low price and slow growth and reproduction make it more valuable as a game fish.

Folklore
Mongolian legend tells of a giant taimen trapped in river ice. Starving herders were able to survive the winter by hacking off pieces of its flesh. In the spring, the ice melted and the giant taimen climbed onto the land, tracked down the herders, and ate them all.
According to Chinese folklore, a type of giant taimen lives in Kanas Lake in China. Villagers near Kanasi claim to have found fish weighing over 4 tonnes.
National Geographic called the taimen the "Mongolian Terror Trout".

References

Further reading
 
 
 Holcik, J., Hensel, K., Nieslanik, J., and L. Skacel. 1988. The Eurasion Huchen, Hucho hucho: largest salmon of the world. Dr. W. Junk Publishers (Kluwer), Dordrecht, Netherlands
 

 Taimen Research 
 From Madison to Mongolia: The crusade for a giant fish

taimen
Fish described in 1773
Taxa named by Peter Simon Pallas